Major-General Robert Charles Cottrell-Hill  (born Robert Charles Hill; 7 November 1903 – 10 November 1965)  was Commandant of the British Sector in Berlin.

Military career
Educated at Bedford School and the Royal Military College, Sandhurst, Cottrell-Hill was commissioned into the Border Regiment in 1924. He served with the 1st Battalion, Border Regiment and was awarded the Military Cross (MC) for bravery at El Yamun near Jenin in Palestine, during the Arab revolt, in 1938, and was later mentioned in dispatches for his services there.

He served in World War II initially as a brigade major and latterly as Commander of the 71st Indian Infantry Brigade. He was awarded the Distinguished Service Order (DSO) for services in Arakan in 1944 and a Bar to his DSO for an assault landing at Ramree Island, located off the coast of Arakan, in 1945.

In 1948 he became Deputy Director of Infantry at the War Office and in 1950 he was made Chief of Staff at Malaya Command. He returned the War Office as Director of Military Training in 1953 and became Commandant of the British Sector in Berlin in 1955. He joined the Regular Commissions Board in 1957 and retired in 1959.

References

External links
Generals of World War II

 

1903 births
1965 deaths
British Army major generals
British Army brigadiers of World War II
British military personnel of the 1936–1939 Arab revolt in Palestine
Border Regiment officers
Commanders of the Order of the British Empire
Companions of the Distinguished Service Order
Companions of the Order of the Bath
Graduates of the Royal Military College, Sandhurst
People educated at Bedford School
People from Maharashtra
Recipients of the Military Cross
Military personnel of British India